Peter Dorn (born November 1931) is a German composer and classical pianist.

Life 
Dorn was born in Wroclaw, capital of Silesia. He attended the Thomasschule zu Leipzig. He studied piano with Gerhard Puchelt and Amadeus Webersinke at the Berlin University of the Arts and the University of Music and Theatre Leipzig. Until 1959, he worked as a pianist in West Germany. Cologne 1968, . He then worked at the Berlin Academy of Arts.

Dorn's violin sonatas are published by C. F. Peters Musikverlag in Leipzig. In 1968, he was awarded the Hanns Eisler Prize in Leipzig for his cantata In deiner Hand steht geschrieben die Zeit. The premiere was given by the MDR Leipzig Radio Symphony Orchestra and the Rundfunkchor Leipzig under the direction of Herbert Kegel. The music prize was awarded for the first time that year, together with the composers Ruth Zechlin and Gerhard Rosenfeld.

His Klaviermusik 1964 was once compared with Mussorgsky's composition Pictures at an Exhibition.

Work  
 Sonatine für Violine und Klavier.
 Sonate für Viola und Klavier
 Klaviermusik in 4 Suiten
 Rhapsodie für Violine und Klavier.
 In deiner Hand steht geschrieben die Zeit
 Divertimento.

Further reading
 Alan Pedigo: International encyclopedia of violin-keyboard sonatas and composer biographies. Arriaga Publications, Booneville 1995, .

References

External links 
 
 

German composers
German classical pianists
20th-century classical composers
1931 births
Living people
People from Wrocław